Methylhistamine may refer to:

 α-Methylhistamine
 4-Methylhistamine